Frank Brian Mercer OBE FRS (22 December 1927 – 22 November 1998) was an English engineer, inventor and businessman.

He was born into a Blackburn family, which for generations had been involved in the textile industry and which owned and controlled companies engaged in spinning, weaving, dyeing and finishing, and educated at the Queen Elizabeth's Grammar School, Blackburn.

In the 1950s, he invented the Netlon process, in which plastics are extruded into a net-like process in one stage, winning the Queen's Award for Technological Achievement. With his inspiration, leadership and drive, he founded Netlon Ltd in 1959 to manufacture the products but most importantly to commercialise the concept. Throughout Brian Mercer's career, he strongly believed in the importance of cooperative research and development through instigating discussion and debate through international commercial and technical conferences.

In 1978 he became a Fellow of the Institute of Materials and the second person to receive their Prince Philip Award. He was elected a Fellow of the Textile Institute in 1973 and in 1988 it bestowed on him an Honorary Fellowship. In 1981 he received the OBE and in 1984 was made a Fellow of the Royal Society. He made a bequest to the Royal Society to establish the Brian Mercer Award for Feasibility, which is given to allow researchers to investigate the technical and economic feasibility of commercialising an aspect of their scientific research.

Modern Tensar geogrids were invented by Dr. Mercer in the late 1970s and early 1980s for the construction industry to provide stabilisation and reinforcement with the underlying concept of simplicity, flexibility and strength.  They are now used throughout the world for soil stabilization applications.

His portrait, painted by Salvador Dalí in 1973, is now owned by the Royal Society. Gala-Salvador Dalí Foundation.

References

Further reading
 Burland, J,B (2009), Opening Address, Jubilee Symposium on Polymer Geogrid Reinforcement. , Published 2010
 http://royalsociety.org/Brian-Mercer-Awards-for-Innovation/
 http://royalsociety.org/Brian-Mercer-Feasibility-Awards/
 http://www.nce.co.uk/brian-mercer-1927-1998/674493.article
 https://www.youtube.com/watch?v=3b_YtG6Y3mc
 https://www.youtube.com/watch?v=qscLgW32L-I

1927 births
1998 deaths
Fellows of the Royal Society
Officers of the Order of the British Empire
20th-century British engineers
People educated at Queen Elizabeth's Grammar School, Blackburn